Lane is an unincorporated community in Douglas County, Nebraska, United States.

History
Lane was a depot on the Union Pacific Railroad.   The community was named for C. J. Lane, a railroad official.

References

Unincorporated communities in Douglas County, Nebraska
Unincorporated communities in Nebraska